In telecommunications, 4G is the fourth generation of cell phone mobile communications standards. It is a successor to the third generation (3G) standards. A 4G system provides mobile "ultra-broadband" Internet access. Major Australian telecommunications companies (colloquially known as "telcos"), and most resellers that use one of these major telcos, have been rolling out and continuing to upgrade 4G since 2011/2012.

Networks

 after analogue TV is switched off and digital TV is re-stacked.

Carrier Aggregation

Optus
In September 2014, Optus launched LTE Carrier Aggregation in Sydney, Melbourne, Brisbane and Adelaide. Optus markets LTE Carrier Aggregation as "4G Plus". Optus combines two 20 MHz channels of 2.3 GHz spectrum.

In Brisbane, Optus has up to 4CA band combinations using Band 1, 3, 7, 28 and the total bandwidth is 55 MHz.

Telstra
At the end of September 2014, Telstra has opted not to extend combined 900 MHz and 1800 MHz Carrier Aggregation service.

In November 2014, Telstra launched LTE Carrier Aggregation (marketed as 4GX) in parts of Sydney, Adelaide, Perth, Darwin and ten regional centres (Albany, Ulladulla, Murray Bridge, Narrawallee, Shepparton, Batemans Bay, Swansea, Bunbury, Port Macquarie and Chinchilla), bringing to 26 the number of communities with the service. The operator wants to bring "4GX" to at least 50 regional centres by New Year's Day. Telstra combines 20 MHz of 700 MHz spectrum and 20 MHz of 1.8 GHz spectrum.

Vodafone
Since 2015, Vodafone has offered carrier aggregation across its main 4G bands, 850 MHz and 1800 MHz.

VoLTE

Telstra

Telstra was the first carrier in Australia to launch VoLTE. The service was initially available on 6 phones (Four being iPhones and two being Samsung Galaxy's). Telstra have switched on the VoLTE on every one of their 4G networks across Australia but currently the 4G small cells setup in regional Australia do not have VoLTE compatibility. The VoLTE network is said to be clearer and provide up to 5 way voice calls.

Optus

Optus commenced the rollout of VoLTE across its 4G Plus mobile network in Australia's major capital cities in May 2016. 
The Samsung Galaxy S7 and Galaxy S7 Edge were the first devices available with Optus VoLTE, with more devices added in the future. Optus postpaid consumer and SMB customers in Sydney, Melbourne, Brisbane, Adelaide, Perth and Canberra CBD metros areas will be among the first to see the rollout of VoLTE.

Vodafone

Vodafone conducted VoLTE trials in early 2015.

Frequencies

700 MHz
The 700 MHz band was previously used for analogue television and became operational with 4G in December 2014.

Optus
Optus announced trials of its 4G 700 MHz network in Darwin and Perth CBDs on 21 July 2014.

The 700mhz network was made active on January 1, 2015.

Telstra
In July 2014 Telstra announced a trial of 4G services in the 700 MHz spectrum in Perth, Fremantle, Esperance, Mildura, Mount Isa and Griffith. Service launched in November 2014. This band will be the basis for the '4GX' brand.

Vodafone
Vodafone acquired some residual spectrum on this band. Their license commences on 1 April 2018.

850 MHz
The 850 MHz band is currently operated as a 3G network by Telstra and as a 4G network by Vodafone.

Vodafone switched on the 4G 850 network on in Adelaide on 6 October 2014. By the end of 2014 all other capital cities were switched over to 4G, and in Q2 2016 all regional sites were activated on 4G on this band.

1800 MHz
The 1800 MHz band is currently operated as a 4G network by Optus, Telstra and Vodafone. It had previously been used as a 2G network.

Optus
Optus has now installed their 4G networks in all the capital cities and thousands of regional areas, and markets that they currently cover 86% of the Australian population with their 4G Plus Network

Telstra
Telstra was the first mobile phone network to operate 4G and 2G in the same band. Their 4G network covers capital cities and some regional areas.

Vodafone
The Vodafone 4G network was first to live in selected metro areas of Sydney, Melbourne, Perth, Adelaide and Brisbane, and the outer metro areas of Wollongong, Gold Coast, Newcastle and Geelong from June 12, 2013. The 1800 MHz network has since been expanded to include all capital cities and major outer metro areas, and a rollout has begun for some regional areas.

2100 MHz
This band is commonly used for 3G services on Telstra and Optus, with only a very limited rollout on 4G. Vodafone have begun completely refarming their 2100 MHz coverage from 3G to 4G.

Vodafone
Since 2015, Vodafone have offered limited coverage using 5 MHz of Band 1 (2100 MHz) spectrum in major regional cities. Starting in 2017, this coverage was increased by adding more locations with 10 MHz bandwidth in regional areas. From 2017 onwards, the 2100 MHz spectrum in metropolitan areas was reformed to 4G.

2300 MHz

Optus
Optus use 2300 MHz TD-LTE (Band 40) in big cities such as Sydney, Melbourne, Brisbane, Adelaide and Canberra, plus selected metropolitan locations.
Optus first launched its TD-LTE network in Canberra in May 2013.

2600 MHz

Optus
Optus and Telstra trialled the 2600 MHz frequency in Australia. Service launched in October 2014.

Telstra

TPG
TPG had initially surprised some by bidding in the auction as they had no infrastructure at the time. On 30 September 2015 TPG signed a deal with Vodafone Australia to gain access to Vodafone base stations. In return, TPG will provide Dark Fibre to Vodafone towers and also move their current mobile subscribers from the Optus network over to the Vodafone network.

4G Sites (Base Stations)
As of 8 March 2019:
 Optus has approximately 6414 4G base stations in Australia 

 Telstra has approximately 5962 4G base stations in Australia 
 Vodafone has approximately 4750 4G base stations in Australia 
 the NBN has approximately 1920 4G base stations in Australia 
 TPG has one 4G base station in Australia (but 811 additional are "proposed")

Performance
In its latest State of Mobile Networks for Australia report, mobile analytics company OpenSignal put Telstra in the lead when it comes to delivering the fastest 4G download, upload and overall speeds. Optus has Australia's most available 4G network, thanks to its LTE rollout. OpenSignal reports its users were able to find an Optus LTE signal 90.5% of the time. Vodafone had the best 4G and overall download speeds in Melbourne and had the lowest 4G latency.

Resellers
The following mobile virtual network operators offer 4G services in Australia:

4G Roaming

Telstra
In January 2013, Telstra launched LTE-Roaming in Hong Kong. Telstra partners with csl.

4G roaming from Telstra in now available in New Zealand, Singapore, Taiwan, Japan, Hong Kong, United Kingdom, Canada and the United States of America

Vodafone

Vodafone has 4G roaming in the Czech Republic, Greece, Ireland, Italy, Netherlands, New Zealand, Portugal, Romania, Spain and the United Kingdom. Both prepaid and postpaid services can use 4G in those countries overseas.

Optus

Optus have 4G roaming switched on but do not publish which countries offer it.

Vodafone
In mid-February 2014, Vodafone announced LTE-Roaming for New Zealand, UK and Europe. In August 2014, Vodafone launched LTE-Roaming for New Zealand.

See also
List of LTE networks
List of mobile network operators of the Asia Pacific region
List of planned LTE networks
Telecommunications in Australia

References

External links
 Optus 4G
 Telstra 4G
 Vodafone 4G

Telecommunications in Australia